Catherine Uhlmyer Connelly (April 4, 1893 – October 17, 2002) was the second-to-last, and the longest-lived survivor of the General Slocum fire of June 15, 1904.

Biography
She was born as Catherine Uhlmyer in Manhattan, New York on April 4, 1893. Her father died before she was a year old, and her mother, Veronica, married John Gallagher.

On June 15, 1904 when she was 11 years old, she was one of the passengers aboard the General Slocum when it caught fire on the East River in New York City. She remembered a boy shouting "fire" while a brass band was playing on the deck of the ship to entertain the travelers. She recounted the images of mothers and children with their clothing on fire drowning in the rough waters of Hell Gate. Others were killed as they were drawn into the blades of the paddlewheel. The total death count was 1,021 of the 1,331 passengers who were on a Sunday school outing, and among the victims were her mother, her nine-year-old brother Walter, and her 9-month-old sister Agnes. "Sometimes he is very cruel, the man upstairs," she said in her interview with The New York Times on May 24, 1989, when she was already 96. This remained the largest single disaster in New York until the September 11, 2001 attacks.

In 1913, she married Thomas Connelly, a truck driver. She had 11 children. Ten of them were born at home. Only two were alive at the time of her death, Jeanette Connelly Meehan, who lived in Goshen, New York, and Elizabeth Gallagher Reilly, who lived in Greenwich, Connecticut. She was also survived by 27 grandchildren, 30 great-grandchildren and 7 great-great-grandchildren.

She lived in a Manhattan apartment by herself until she was 102. She then moved to a nursing home in Connecticut to be closer to her daughter Elizabeth. She died on October 17, 2002 at the age of 109.

See also

Adella Wotherspoon, the last survivor

References

External links
General Slocum Website
Findagrave: Catherine Uhlmyer

1893 births
2002 deaths
American centenarians
PS General Slocum
People from Wilton, Connecticut
People from Manhattan
Women centenarians